The Lowell Historic Preservation District is a historic district created by the legislation establishing Lowell National Historic Park. It includes the industrial mill complexes, worker housing areas, central business district, and civic heart of the city, as well as the water power infrastructure that powered the mills.

The district was listed on the National Register of Historic Places in 2001.

See also
National Register of Historic Places listings in Lowell, Massachusetts

References

National Register of Historic Places in Lowell, Massachusetts
Historic districts in Lowell, Massachusetts
2001 establishments in Massachusetts
Historic districts on the National Register of Historic Places in Massachusetts